The Cathedral School may refer to:

 The Cathedral School, Townsville, Queensland, Australia
 The Cathedral School, Llandaff, Wales

In the United States:
 Cathedral School (Maine), in Portland (1864—2011)
 The Cathedral School, New York, of the Archdiocesan Cathedral of the Holy Trinity, New York City
 The Cathedral School of St. John the Divine, New York City
 Episcopal Collegiate School, formerly The Cathedral School, Little Rock, Arkansas
 National Cathedral School, Washington, D.C.